Nicholas Comper (29 April 1897 – 17 June 1939) was an English aviator and aircraft designer, whose most notable success was the 1930s Comper Swift monoplane racer.

Early life
Nicholas Comper was born in Lambeth, London, England, the son of church architect Sir John Ninian Comper. After leaving Dulwich College, he joined the Aircraft Manufacturing Company (Airco) as an apprentice. He left the company in 1915 to join the Royal Flying Corps, and was trained to fly at Castle Bromwich Aerodrome. He joined No. 9 Squadron RFC, and was posted to Morlancourt in France, flying B.E.2c aircraft on reconnaissance missions.

After World War I, Comper stayed in what was then the Royal Air Force, and in 1920 he studied aerodynamics at Jesus College, Cambridge. He spent time with RAE Farnborough, and in October 1922 he was posted to RAF Cranwell to train engineering officers. One of his pupils was Frank Whittle, the jet engine pioneer.

In 1923, Comper and some of his pupils and other members of staff formed the Cranwell Light Aeroplane Club. The Club went on to build four aircraft designed by Comper, named Cranwell C.L.A.2, C.L.A.3, and two examples of the C.L.A.4A. In late 1926 he was posted to the Marine Aircraft Experimental Establishment (MAEE) Felixstowe to work on flying boats and seaplanes. In March 1929, having reached the rank of Flight Lieutenant, he resigned his commission to pursue aircraft design ambitions.

Civilian life
In April 1929, he formed the Comper Aircraft Company Ltd, based at Hooton Park Aerodrome near Ellesmere Port in Cheshire. His first design to be built at Hooton was his most successful, the Comper Swift, a single-seat sporting monoplane. In March 1933, the company moved to Heston Aerodrome near London. The company ceased trading in August 1934.

In August 1934, Comper joined with Francis R Walker to form a design consultancy named Comper and Walker Ltd, based in central London. He worked on airliner projects he called Dominion and Commerce. In December 1936, he renamed the company Comper Aeroplanes Limited, to develop those concepts. In 1938, working from his home in Walton-on-Thames, Comper designed a new training aircraft named the Comper Scamp. The single-seat trial version named the CF.1 Fly was built by students at the Chelsea College of Aeronautical Engineering at Brooklands Aerodrome.

On 17 June 1939, in Hythe, Kent, Comper was fatally injured in unusual circumstances. He had been a practical joker, and after he was stopped lighting fireworks in a public house, he went outside. As he bent down to light the firework, a passer-by enquired what he was doing, his reply was that he was an IRA man and was going to blow up the town hall, prompting the passer-by to knock him down. Comper hit his head on the kerb, suffered a cerebral haemorrhage and died later in hospital, aged 42.

After Comper's death, the Comper CF.1 Fly was completed with RAF serial T1788 by Heston Aircraft Company, who failed to make it fly with the available engine power. Comper's collaborator on the CF.1 project, Gerard Fane, later developed the concept into a newly designed Air Observation Post (AOP) aircraft, the Fane F.1/40.

Aircraft designed and flown
 1924 - Cranwell CLA.2
 1925 - Cranwell CLA.3
 1926 - Cranwell CLA.4
 1930 - Comper Swift
 1932 - Cierva C.25
 1933 - Comper Mouse
 1934 - Comper Streak
 1934 - Comper Kite

Notes

References
Aitken, Kenneth. February 1994. Fathers of British Aviation No.12: Nicholas Comper. Aeroplane Monthly. IPC Media 
Boughton, Terence. 1963. The Story of The British Light Aeroplane. John Murray 

Meaden, Jack & Fillmore, Malcolm. (Winter 2003). The Comper Lightplanes. Air-Britain Archive (quarterly). Air-Britain.  
Riding, Richard T. August&September 1978. British Pre-war Ultra-lights No.28: Comper Swift. Aeroplane Monthly. IPC Media
Riding, Richard T. 1987. Ultralights: The Early British Classics. Patrick Stephens  
Riding, Richard T. March 2003. Database: Comper Swift. Aeroplane Monthly. IPC Media

External links
Nick Comper official website

English aviators
English aerospace engineers
Royal Air Force officers
1897 births
1939 deaths
Accidental deaths in England
People from Lambeth
Alumni of Jesus College, Cambridge
Royal Flying Corps officers
British Army personnel of World War I